Horatio is a male given name.

Horatio may also refer to:

Places

United States
Horatio, Arkansas, a city
Horatio, Mississippi, an unincorporated community
Horatio, Ohio, an unincorporated community
Horatio, Pennsylvania, an unincorporated community
Horatio, South Carolina, an unincorporated community

Other uses
 Horatio, a faction in the strategy game, Endless Space
 Horatius Cocles, legendary Roman defender of the Pons Sublicius bridge
 Horatio (crater), a crater in the Taurus-Littrow valley of Earth's Moon

See also
 Horace (65–8 BC), Roman poet
 Horacio
 Horatius (disambiguation)